Saint Joe is a town in Concord Township, DeKalb County, Indiana, United States. The population was 460 at the 2010 census.

History
Saint Joe was laid out in 1875, and incorporated as a town in 1899. The town derives its name from the St. Joseph River.

Geography
Saint Joe is located at  (41.314829, -84.900696).

Demographics

2010 census
As of the census of 2010, there were 460 people, 157 households, and 115 families living in the town. The racial makeup of the town was 95.9% White, 0.9% Asian, 0.4% from other races, and 2.8% from two or more races. Hispanic or Latino of any race were 3.7% of the population.

There were 157 households, of which 42.7% had children under the age of 18 living with them, 55.4% were married couples living together, 7.0% had a female householder with no husband present, 10.8% had a male householder with no wife present, and 26.8% were non-families. 19.1% of all households were made up of individuals, and 7% had someone living alone who was 65 years of age or older. The average household size was 2.93 and the average family size was 3.39.

The median age in the town was 33.1 years. 32.6% of residents were under the age of 18; 9.9% were between the ages of 18 and 24; 23.7% were from 25 to 44; 23% were from 45 to 64; and 10.9% were 65 years of age or older. The gender makeup of the town was 50.9% male and 49.1% female.

2000 census
As of the census of 2000, there were 478 people, 165 households, and 132 families living in the town. The racial makeup of the town was 97.49% White, 0.21% African American, 0.21% Native American, 1.46% from other races, and 0.63% from two or more races. Hispanic or Latino of any race were 3.77% of the population.

There were 165 households, out of which 45.5% had children under the age of 18 living with them, 64.2% were married couples living together, 10.3% had a female householder with no husband present, and 19.4% were non-families. 18.2% of all households were made up of individuals, and 7.3% had someone living alone who was 65 years of age or older. The average household size was 2.90 and the average family size was 3.22.

In the town, the population was spread out, with 32.2% under the age of 18, 9.8% from 18 to 24, 32.4% from 25 to 44, 15.5% from 45 to 64, and 10.0% who were 65 years of age or older. The median age was 32 years. For every 100 females, there were 105.2 males. For every 100 females age 18 and over, there were 102.5 males.

The median income for a household in the town was $36,417, and the median income for a family was $36,833. Males had a median income of $33,125 versus $22,109 for females. The per capita income for the town was $14,570. About 4.6% of families and 5.5% of the population were below the poverty line, including 1.9% of those under age 18 and 12.5% of those age 65 or over.

Emergency services
For EMERGENCIES call 911.

Non-Emergency Central Dispatch for Dekalb County

Fire & Rescue:   Concord Township Fire Department
Police: Dekalb County Sheriff's Department & Indiana State Police
EMS:    Dekalb EMS

Dekalb County Department of Homeland Security for any non-specific threats.

All Emergency Services are available 24 hours a day.

Education 
The town of Saint Joe lies in the school district of Dekalb County Eastern Community School District. Local schools residents attend are:

Riverdale Elementary School (K-6) in St. Joe
Butler Elementary (K-6)
Eastside Junior-Senior High School (7-12)

Parks & Recreation 
There are several recreational centers in Saint Joe, including:
Wild Cherry Park
Saint Mark's Lutheran Church's Park
 Saint Joseph River Greenway
Riverdale Elementary School's Playground
Saint Joe Church of Christ's Playground
Saint Joe Valley Conservation Club
Public access to the Saint Joseph River
Four baseball diamonds:
Three at Riverdale Elementary
One at NUCOR
About one mile east of town

Churches 
The town of Saint Joe is home to three churches:
Saint Joe Church of Christ
Saint Mark's Lutheran Church
Coburn Corners Church of Christ
Located 3 miles to the southeast of town

Arts and culture 
The town of Saint Joe holds an annual Pickle Festival in honor of the Pickle industry local to the town.

References

External links

 Town Website
 Sechler's Pickles
 NUCOR
 Coburn Corners
 Saint Joseph River Greenway on Indiana Trails
 Saint Joseph River Greenway (Official)
 Dekalb County Eastern Community School District website

Towns in DeKalb County, Indiana
Towns in Indiana
1875 establishments in Indiana
Populated places established in 1875